The 2009 Summer Deaflympics, officially known as the XXI Summer Deaflympic Games and commonly known as Taipei 2009, is an international multi-sport event that was celebrated from 5 to 15 September 2009 in Taipei, Taiwan (Republic of China). It is the third Summer Deaflympics to be held in the Asia-Pacific region. Judo, karate, and taekwondo have been recognized as new summer disciplines in the Deaflympics sports competition program.

Bidding process
The Chinese Taipei Sport Association for the Deaf expressed its intention to bid for the 2009 Summer Deaflympics following its participation at the 2001 Summer Deaflympics in Rome. Athens, Greece, the host city of the 2004 Summer Olympics and the 2004 Summer Paralympics, was also bidding for the hosting right.

On November 24, 2002, ICSD President John Lovett arrived in Taipei, and visited all recommended venues and facilities during the one-week stay. The Chinese Taipei Sport Association for the Deaf gave Mr. Lovett multimedia presentations and made arrangements for him to meet with President Chen Shui-bian, Chinese Taipei Olympic Committee Chairman Huang Ta-chou, and other officials.

Taipei was chosen to host the 21st Summer Deaflympics in a vote held at the 38th ICSD session, finishing ahead of Athens, Greece. Below was the vote count that occurred on February 28, 2003, in Sundsvall, Sweden:

Preparation
Preparation for the Games started in 2005, with an estimated total budget of NT$ 4.6 billion for the required infrastructure. The construction of the Taipei Stadium alone costs around NT$3 billion. The funding is provided by the Taipei City Government and the Sports Affairs Council. The main stadium Taipei Stadium was completed on June 15, 2009, and was certified as a Class 1 Athletics Facility by the IAAF. Besides opening/closing ceremonies and athletics, the football finals were also held at the Taipei Stadium.

Volunteers
According to the Organising Committee's estimates, based on a 2:1 ratio of athletes to volunteers, the Games required approximately 3,000 volunteers. The volunteers were grouped into 3 categories: regular, foreign language and sign language volunteers, all must accept 120 hours training, including basic, work-specific and sign language trainings. The Taipei Deaflympics have received over 8,000 volunteer applications.

Deaflympics Arts Month
The Organising Committee has designated August 2009 as the "Taipei Deaflympics Arts Month", during which famous artists and art groups are invited to perform at the Taipei Arena, such as A-mei, Blue Man Group, Dynamic Yunnan, and Minghuayuan. The "Taipei International Deaf Culture Fair" was also held, with a series of exhibitions and activities that promoted understanding of the Deaf culture.

Marketing

Emblem
The emblem comes from the shape of the Chinese character for north, representing the host city Taipei, with an ear representing the Deaflympics, and a figure as the main body representing the athletes. The design uses the blue, white and red color scheme of the national flag and simple, flowing calligraphic lines, evoking the "image of running man". It symbolizes the courageous spirits of the athletes as they excel and meet the challenges as well as the vitality of Taiwan.

Motto
The 2009 Summer Deaflympics motto is "Power in me!". The Chinese version is "無聲的力量" (literally, "The Power of Silence").

Mascots
The Games' mascots are one male and one female Taipei green treefrogs. The mascots have their arms wide open, in a welcoming pose that looks like the Chinese character "北", which represents the host city Taipei.

A mascot naming contest was held by the Organising Committee. The names chosen are "Peace" for the male frog mascot and "Love" for the female frog mascot.

Theme song
The theme song is "Dreams You Can Hear", performed by A-mei.

Sponsors

Sports
The various sports offered at the 2009 Summer Deaflympics were held in 20 disciplines, including 15 individual sports and 5 team sports:

Individual sports

Team sports
  (2)
  (2)
  (2)
  (1)
  (2)
  (1)

Venues
The Games were held in 22 venues, most of which located in Taipei City and Taipei County (now New Taipei City). Some events were held in Taoyuan County and Hsinchu County, namely swimming and water polo in Hsinchu County Swimming Plaza, shooting in Taoyuan County Gongxi Shooting Range, and tennis (backup venue for rain) in  Taoyuan campus of National Taiwan Sport University.

Opening/Closing Ceremonies: Taipei Stadium
 Athletics: Taipei Stadium, Zhongzheng Senior High School (Backup Venue), Yangming Senior High School (Backup Venue)
 Marathon: Northern Coast Highway
 Badminton: Taipei Gymnasium
 Basketball: Taipei Gymnasium
 Beach volleyball: Pacific Green Bay
 Bowling: Xinqiaofu Bowling Center
 Cycling, Road: Northern Coast Highway (Road Race), Taipei City Hall Plaza (Points Race, Time Trial)
 Football: Taipei Stadium (Final), Yingfeng Riverside Sport Park (Preliminary)
 Handball: Chenggong Senior High School
 Judo: Taiwan Police College
 Karate: Nangang Sports Center
 Orienteering: Yangmingshan National Park
 Shooting: Gongxi Shooting Range
 Swimming: Hsinchu County Swimming Plaza
 Table tennis: Taipei Arena
 Taekwondo: National Taipei University of Education
 Tennis: Rainbow Riverside Sport Park, National Taiwan Sport University (Backup Venue for Rain)
 Volleyball: National Taiwan University, Xinzhuang Stadium
 Water polo: Hsinchu County Swimming Plaza
 Wrestling, Freestyle: Chinese Culture University
 Wrestling, Greco-Roman: Chinese Culture University

Participating Deaf Sports Federations
80 Deaf Sports Federations have registered with ICSD:

Opening ceremonies
The Organising Committee of the 21st Summer Deaflympics recruited acclaimed Taiwanese playwright and theatre director Dr. Stan Lai as the Games' Art Director, and to orchestrate the opening and closing ceremonies.

According to Stan Lai, ceremony general director, the opening of the Deaflympics will be a "memorable event that will call forth the beauty of the human heart and reach out to the deaf community." It will be divided into 12 acts, including a performance titled "Impossible Dream" by renowned Taiwanese model Patina Lin. Completely covered in body paint, Lin will float across a 50-meter projection screen to create the illusion of a goddess walking through air and water. She will also perform along with children from schools for the hearing-impaired, using sign language to express the message of "Power in Me," Lai said.

World-renowned deaf percussionist Evelyn Glennie has been invited to perform at the opening ceremony, as well as the local drumming group U-Theatre, and more than 80 children from schools for the hearing-impaired in Taipei and Taichung cities, according to Lai.

The team from the People's Republic of China did not attend the opening ceremony. Neither side has officially given the reason, although most news sites are attributing it to the Dalai Lama's recent trip to Taiwan. The People's Republic of China had previously not attended the opening of the World Games which was held in Kaohsiung  earlier in the year. Nonetheless, China has sent 63 hearing impaired dancers from the Mainland China to perform the "1,000 hand Bodhisattva" at the ceremony.

Closing Ceremonies
In a creative move, a banquet where 12 typical Taiwanese dishes were served at 350 tables dominated the closing ceremony for the 11-day event in Taipei. The parades, fireworks and arts performances usually seen at such events were also present, but played a secondary role. The menu for the banquet included peanuts from Yunlin County, beef noodles, pineapple cakes, highland tea, and mango shaved ice, accompanied by pearl milk tea and vinegar-based fruit drinks. Some of the foods had been seen at the September 5th opening in a plastic and cloth version during a show representing the best of Taiwanese cuisine and culture. While the athletes tucked into the local delicacies, the 14,000 members of the public were able to exchange their tickets for food valued at NT$200 per person.

Performances including Taiwanese opera from the famous Ming Hwa Yuan troupe, lion dances, drums, and three songs, including the closing theme song of the 2009 Deaflympics, from Aaron Kwok, a pop star from Hong Kong. He said with passion, "I witnessed a successful closing ceremony tonight. Just like I've said during the performance, the Deaflympics touches our heart and Taipei has touched the world."  A movie was also presented depicting the athletic highlights of the 2009 Summer Deaflympics.

At the end, the flag was passed on to the Greek capital of Athens, the host of the 2013 Summer Deaflympics scheduled for 2013. The fourth Deaflympics in the Asia-Pacific region will also be preserved in history as the best ever for host Chinese Taipei, which won 11 gold medals, 11 silvers and 11 bronzes. The country placed fifth for the number of medals won, with Russia coming first after collecting 29 golds, 40 silvers and 28 bronzes. Ukraine came second, South Korea third, and the People's Republic of China fourth.

Chinese Taipei's strongest performances were on show in bowling, table tennis, and taekwondo, the Korean martial art that has also brought success to Taipei athletes at Olympic Games. One Taipei athlete alone, Chang Yao-chien, collected four golds in women's bowling. Nevertheless, the country still fell narrowly short of its self-set goal of 12 gold medals, which officials blamed on the limited source of talent available.

On the political side of the sporting event, the People's Republic of China announced earlier it would be present for the closing ceremony, after having missed the opening, widely thought to have been planned that way to avoid the presence of President Ma Ying-jeou. The team's deputy leader, Zhao Sujing, told reporters that the 78 Chinese participants had to come together in Beijing from all parts of China first, and that problems with airline ticketing had caused them to miss earlier flights to Taipei. However, more than ten athletes were to be present in Taiwan to participate in the closing ceremony. The People's Republic of China won 12 golds, nine silver and 17 bronze medals, or double its amount at the Melbourne Deaflympics four years ago. Praising the organization, International Committee of Sports for the Deaf President Donalda Ammons used sign language to say "the Taipei Deaflympics were the best ever."

She received the keys to Taipei and the honorary citizenship of the city from the hands of Mayor of Taipei Hau Lung-pin. He bestowed similar honors on other ICSD officials, including executive member and China team leader Yang Yang, the first-ever Chinese citizen to receive honorary citizenship in Taipei.

Overall, most regarded the ceremony as a success. The only "unwelcome intrusion to an otherwise perfect ending was the deportation of a Spanish athlete for alleged sexual harassment of a volunteer."

Medal Tally

Calendar
In the following calendar for the 2009 Summer Deaflympics, each blue box represents an event competition. The yellow boxes represent days during which medal-awarding finals for a sport are held. The number in each yellow box represents the number of finals that are contested on that day.*

See also
 List of sporting events in Taiwan

References

External links

The 21st Summer Deaflympics
International Committee of Sports for the Deaf

 
Deaflympics
Summer Deaflympics, 2009
Sports competitions in Taipei
International sports competitions hosted by Taiwan
Multi-sport events in Taiwan
Deaflympics
2000s in Taipei
September 2009 sports events in Asia